FME may refer to:

Entertainment 
 Film and Music Entertainment, a British film production company
 Finnish Metal Expo, a music festival

Technology 
 FME connector, a type of coaxial cable connector
 FME (software), a spatial data integration and conversion application
 Fairbanks Morse Engine, engine manufacturing subsidiary of EnPro Industries
 Fourier–Motzkin elimination, a mathematical technique
 Fujitsu Microelectronics Europe GmbH, former name of Fujitsu Semiconductor Europe GmbH

Other uses 
 Federación Mexicana de Esgrima, the Mexican Fencing Federation
  (Financial Supervisory Authority (Iceland), an Icelandic government agency 
 Force medical examiner, any doctor employed by police in the United Kingdom as an expert in a law enforcement matter
 Forest Movement Europe, an environmental organization
 Formal Methods Europe, an NGO for encouraging formal methods in computer hardware and software development
 Free-market environmentalism, a political philosophy
 FME, IATA code for Tipton Airport, in Maryland, United States